Hildring is the third of three albums by the Norwegian synth-duo Langsomt Mot Nord.

Tracks

 Vårvons Pris (5:03)Composed By – Ola Snortheim, Espen Beranek HolmArranged By – Espen Beranek Holm, Ola SnortheimProducers – Ola Snortheim, Espen Beranek HolmDrum Programming – Ola SnortheimKeyboards – Espen Beranek HolmLangeleik – Olav SnortheimViolin – Odd HannisdalFlute – Torstein KvenåsElectric Guitar – Fredrik Sager
 Brynhild (3:47)Composed By – Ola Snortheim, Espen Beranek HolmArranged By – Espen Beranek Holm, Ola SnortheimProducers – Ola Snortheim, Espen Beranek HolmDrum Programming – Ola SnortheimKeyboards – Espen Beranek HolmFlute – Torstein KvenåsAcoustic Guitar – Fredrik SagerElectric Guitar – Fredrik Sager
 Eira (3:42)Composed By – Ola Snortheim, Espen Beranek HolmArranged By – Espen Beranek Holm, Ola SnortheimProducers – Ola Snortheim, Espen Beranek HolmDrum Programming – Ola SnortheimKeyboards – Espen Beranek HolmVocals – Tora UlstrupFlute – Torstein KvenåsAcoustic Guitar – Fredrik Sager
 Gry (3:34)Composed By – Ola Snortheim, Espen Beranek HolmArranged By – Espen Beranek Holm, Ola SnortheimProducers – Ola Snortheim, Espen Beranek HolmDrum Programming – Ola SnortheimKeyboards – Espen Beranek HolmFlute – Torstein Kvenås
 Pillarguri (3:20)Composed By – Ola Snortheim, Espen Beranek HolmArranged By – Espen Beranek Holm, Ola SnortheimProducers – Ola Snortheim, Espen Beranek HolmDrum Programming – Ola SnortheimKeyboards – Espen Beranek HolmTrombone – Synnøve HannisdalAcoustic Guitar – Fredrik Sager
 Hildring (3:35)Composed By – Ola Snortheim, Espen Beranek HolmArranged By – Espen Beranek Holm, Ola SnortheimProducers – Ola Snortheim, Espen Beranek HolmDrum Programming – Ola SnortheimKeyboards – Espen Beranek HolmViolin – Odd HannisdalsFlute – Torstein KvenåssTrombone – Synnøve Hannisdal
 Sval Vidde (3:58)Composed By – Ola Snortheim, Espen Beranek HolmArranged By – Espen Beranek Holm, Ola SnortheimProducers – Ola Snortheim, Espen Beranek HolmDrum Programming – Ola SnortheimKeyboards – Espen Beranek HolmViolin – Odd HannisdalFlute – Torstein KvenåsTrombone – Synnøve HannisdalElectric Guitar – Fredrik Sager
 Varsling (2:33)Composed By – Ola Snortheim, Espen Beranek HolmArranged By – Espen Beranek Holm, Ola SnortheimProducers – Ola Snortheim, Espen Beranek HolmDrum Programming – Ola SnortheimKeyboards – Espen Beranek HolmFlute – Torstein KvenåsElectric Guitar – Fredrik Sager
 Dovrehall (3:01)Composed By – Ola Snortheim, Espen Beranek HolmArranged By – Espen Beranek Holm, Ola SnortheimProducers – Ola Snortheim, Espen Beranek HolmDrum Programming – Ola SnortheimKeyboards – Espen Beranek HolmHardingfele – Magne HesjevollFlute – Torstein KvenåsAccordion – Harald VelsandElectric Guitar – Fredrik Sager
 Rimfrost (2:56)Composed By – Ola Snortheim, Espen Beranek HolmArranged By – Espen Beranek Holm, Ola SnortheimProducers – Ola Snortheim, Espen Beranek HolmDrum Programming – Ola SnortheimKeyboards – Espen Beranek HolmTrombone – Synnøve HannisdalElectric Guitar – Fredrik Sager
 Troll (3:06)Composed By – Ola Snortheim, Espen Beranek HolmArranged By – Espen Beranek Holm, Ola SnortheimProducers – Ola Snortheim, Espen Beranek HolmDrum Programming – Ola SnortheimKeyboards – Espen Beranek HolmFlute – Torstein KvenåsTrombone – Synnøve HannisdalElectric Guitar – Fredrik Sager
 Fanteladden (2:59)Composed By – Ola Snortheim, Espen Beranek HolmArranged By – Espen Beranek Holm, Ola SnortheimProducers – Ola Snortheim, Espen Beranek HolmDrum Programming – Ola SnortheimKeyboards – Espen Beranek HolmViolin – Odd HannisdalFlute – Torstein KvenåsAcoustic Guitar – Fredrik Sager
 Brudemarsj Frå Vågå (3:47)Composed By – Ola Snortheim, Espen Beranek HolmArranged By – Espen Beranek Holm, Ola SnortheimProducers – Ola Snortheim, Espen Beranek HolmDrum Programming – Ola SnortheimKeyboards – Espen Beranek HolmVocals – Tora UlstrupLangeleik – Olav Snortheim

Credits
 Drum Programming, Drums – Ola Snortheim
 Keyboards, Synthesizers – Espen Beranek Holm
 Programming – Espen Beranek Holm
 Sequencing – Ola Snortheim, Espen Beranek Holm
 Mixed By – Ola Snortheim, Espen Beranek Holm
 Cover Photo – Rolf Sørensen, Jørn Bøhmer, Sóley Sveinsdottir
 Cover Layout – Harald Lervik
 Other – Hagström Musikk A/S

Guest musicians: Olav Snortheim; langeleik.  Tora Ulstrup; vocals. Magne Hesjevoll; hardanger fiddle. Odd Hannisdal; violin. Torstein Kvenås; flute. Synnøve Hannisdal; trombone. Harald Velsand; Accordion. Fredrik Sager; guitars.

References

External links 
 Langsomt Mot Nord Wikipedia
 Hildring (1991) Rockipedia
 Langsomt Mot Nord's official web-page
 Hildring Discogs

Langsomt Mot Nord albums
1991 albums